Carpatho-Ruthenian or Carpathian Ruthenian may refer to:

 something or someone related to Carpathian Ruthenia

Peoples:
 Carpatho-Ruthenian Rusyns - Rusyns from Carpathian Ruthenia
 Carpatho-Ruthenian Jews - Jews from Carpathian Ruthenia

Languages:
 Carpatho-Ruthenian dialects - an exonymic term for linguistic varieties of Rusyn and Ukrainian languages in the region of Carpathian Ruthenia

See also
 Ruthenia (disambiguation)
 Ruthenian (disambiguation)